Simon Sešlar (born 5 April 1974) is a Slovenian football manager and former player.

Sešlar was capped 19 times for the Slovenian national team between 1997 and 2005.

References

External links

1974 births
Living people
Sportspeople from Celje
Slovenian footballers
Association football midfielders
Slovenian PrvaLiga players
2. Bundesliga players
Belgian Pro League players
Israeli Premier League players
Cypriot First Division players
2. Liga (Austria) players
Slovenian Second League players
NK Celje players
SSV Ulm 1846 players
NK Maribor players
Lierse S.K. players
Hapoel Nof HaGalil F.C. players
AEL Limassol players
TSV Hartberg players
Expatriate footballers in Israel
Expatriate footballers in Germany
Expatriate footballers in Belgium
Expatriate footballers in Cyprus
Expatriate footballers in Austria
Slovenian expatriate sportspeople in Israel
Slovenian expatriate sportspeople in Germany
Slovenian expatriate sportspeople in Belgium
Slovenian expatriate sportspeople in Cyprus
Slovenian expatriate sportspeople in Austria
Slovenian expatriate footballers
Slovenia under-21 international footballers
Slovenia international footballers
Slovenian football managers
NK Celje managers